Anemonoides nemorosa (syn. Anemone nemorosa), the wood anemone, is an early-spring flowering plant in the buttercup family Ranunculaceae, native to Europe. Other common names include windflower, European thimbleweed, and smell fox, an allusion to the musky smell of the leaves.

Description

The compound basal leaves are palmate or ternate (divided into three lobes). They grow from underground root-like stems called rhizomes and die back down by mid summer (summer dormant).

The plants start blooming in spring, March to May in the British Isles soon after the foliage emerges from the ground. The flowers are solitary, held above the foliage on short stems, with a whorl of three palmate or palmately-lobed leaflike bracts beneath. The flowers are  diameter, with six or seven (and on rare occasions eight to ten) tepals (petal-like segments) with many stamens. In the wild the flowers are usually white but may be pinkish, lilac or blue, and often have a darker tint on the backs of the tepals.

Similar species
The yellow wood anemone (Anemonoides ranunculoides) is slightly smaller, with yellow flowers and usually without basal leaves.

Wood sorrel Oxalis acetosella, which grows in similar shaded places, can be readily distinguished by its 3-parted, clover-like leaves and smaller flowers with only white petals and 5 sepals.

Distribution and habitat

The native range of Anemonoides nemorosa extends across Europe to western Asia, reaching as far south as the Caucasus Mountains in Turkey. It has been introduced into New Zealand and elsewhere. In North America, there are naturalized populations at well-known sites in Newfoundland, Quebec, and Massachusetts.

A. nemorosa is often found in shady woods. The species is common in the British Isles but it spreads very slowly there, by as little as six feet per century, so it is often used as an indicator for ancient woodland.

Ecology

The flowers are pollinated by insects, especially hoverflies. The seeds are achenes.

In cultivation
Many cultivars have been selected for garden use, The RHS Plant Finder 2008–2009 lists 70 cultivars sold by nurseries in the UK. Some of the most widely available are:

 'Alba Plena' - double white
 'Allenii' - large lavender-blue flowers, often with seven petals (named after James Allen, nurseryman)
 'Bowles' Purple' - purple flowers (named after E.A. Bowles, plantsman and garden writer)
 'Bracteata Pleniflora' - double, white flowers, with green streaks and a frilly ruff of bracts
 'Robinsoniana' - pale lavender-blue flowers (named after William Robinson, plantsman and garden writer)
 'Royal Blue' - deep blue flowers with purple backs
 'Vestal' - white, anemone-centred flowers
 'Virescens' - flowers mutated into small conical clusters of leaves

Those marked  are recipients of the Royal Horticultural Society's Award of Garden Merit. 

Anemonoides × lipsiensis, a hybrid between A. nemorosa and A. ranunculoides, has pale yellow flowers; A. × lipsiensis 'Pallida' is the best-known result of this cross. It has also been awarded the AGM.

Gallery

References

Further reading
 Shirreffs, D. A. 1985. Anemone nemorosa L. Journal of Ecology 73: 1005-1020.
 
Plantlife - Wood Anemone

nemorosa
Ephemeral plants
Flora of Europe
Flora of Great Britain
Garden plants of Europe
Medicinal plants of Europe
Plants described in 1753
Taxa named by Carl Linnaeus